Hypsoblennius hentz, commonly known as the feather blenny, is a species of combtooth blenny found on coral reefs in the western Atlantic Ocean. This species grows to a length of  total length.
The feather blenny is found from Nova Scotia, Canada to Texas along the shore of North America. Often, feather blennies can be found in oyster reefs and rocky shores. The identity of the person honoured in this species' specific name is uncertain but it is thought that to have been the French American arachnologist Nicholas Marcellus Hentz (1797-1856) who is the "Mr Hentz" from Charleston, North Carolina who sent the type to Lesueur.

References

feather blenny
Fish of the Eastern United States
Fauna of the Southeastern United States
feather blenny